Şerif Yenen (born 17 May 1963) is a travel specialist, tour guide, travel writer, film-maker, international keynote speaker and lecturer. He wrote Turkish Odyssey in English, the “first guidebook of Turkey ever written by a Turk”.

Yenen gives lectures about travel and Turkish history and culture, the majority of which are in academic communities. His guidebooks are used as textbooks or are on suggested reading lists at various universities, and his articles and columns are published in international magazines and national newspapers.

Biography

Early life and education
Şerif Yenen was born into a middle-class family in the town of Ödemiş near Izmir in 1963. After completing middle school in Ödemiş, when he was fourteen, he passed the entrance exams and became a military student at the Kuleli Military High School in Istanbul, where the instruction was mainly in English. After high school he was accepted in the Department of English Literature and Linguistics at the University of Istanbul as a military student. After graduation from the university in 1985, he became an officer in the Turkish Military Forces, and taught English as a second language for four years at the Maltepe Military High School in Izmir. He left the Army in 1989 and attended tourist guide training programs offered by the Ministry of Tourism of Turkey and became qualified as a national tourist guide.

Career
While working as a tourist guide, he published his guidebook, Turkish Odyssey in English (turkishodyssey.com), in 1997. The content and the design of his website gained attention in the media and won numerous awards. He published the multimedia version of the same work as a CD-ROM in 2001.

Yenen has held elected positions on the boards of various organizations in the tourism sector:

 President of the Istanbul Tourist Guides' Guild (IRO) 2002-2015

 President of the Federation of Turkish Tourist Guide Associations (TUREB) 2002 - 2013

 President of the Tourist Guides Foundation (TUREV), 2002 – 2009

 Executive board member of the World Federation of Tourist Guide Associations (WFTGA), and editor-in-chief of the Guidelines Internetion@l magazine, 2003 – 2007

 Vice President of Turkish Travel Agencies and Tourist Guides Assembly, established as a tourism council within TOBB (The Union of Chambers and Commodity Exchanges of Turkey) 2006 - 2013.

 Member of the Consultative Committee for Istanbul 2010 Cultural Capital of Europe

Yenen regularly wrote a weekly column in the Mediterranean supplement of the Turkish newspaper Akşam between 2006 and 2009 under the heading A Tourist Guide’s Perspective.

Şerif Yenen, who has been attracting media attention for his endeavors as the chairman of IRO and TUREB to make sure that the occupational bill of law for the tourist guides of Turkey is passed by the parliament, played a decisive role in 2012 during the process of drawing up and passage of the law, which had been much anticipated by the tourist guides for the past 40 years. As a result of his endeavors, the occupational law was promulgated in the Official Gazette and entered into force on June 22, 2012. Thus, tourist guiding was defined as a profession in Turkey.

He has given private guide services to celebrities or statesmen, among whom are Pope Benedict XVI, Oprah Winfrey, Princess Michael of Kent, Lester Holt from Today Show-NBC, etc.

Yenen's second guidebook was the 488-page Quick Guide Istanbul, then started "Istanbul", "Culture" and "Turkey" series of his Quick Guide Pamphlets.  These are user friendly and informative fold-out pamphlets of museums, monuments and cultural highlights. While working as an active tourist guide, Şerif Yenen gives lectures and training for tourist guides. In addition to his positions at various tourism organizations, he is consulted on TV programs and juries.

He has produced a travel documentary film on Istanbul in 2014: Istanbul Unveiled.
Şerif Yenen gives lessons on Anatolian Civilizations and Cultural Heritage of Turkey at the Bilgi and Boğaziçi Universities as a part-time instructor.

Awards

Publications
 Turkish Odyssey, A Cultural Guide to Turkey (English), 
 Turkish Odyssey CD-ROM, 
 Turkish Odyssey, A Cultural Guide to Turkey with CD-ROM (English), 
 Anadolu Destanı, Türkiye Gezi Rehberi (Turkish), 
 In Turchia, Un Viaggio nella Cultura Anatolica (Italian), 
 Die Türkische Odyssee, Ein Kulturreiseführer für die Türkei (German), 
 Quick Guide Istanbul (English), 
 Profesyonel Turist Rehberinin El Kitabı (Handbook for Tourist Guides), 
 Seyahat İpuçları (Travel Tips), 
 Top 10 Places in İstanbul, 
 En İyi 10 İstanbul, 
 Ottoman Highlights in İstanbul, 
 Byzantine Highlights in İstanbul, 
 Cultural Selections - Turkey's Top 5,

References

External links
 
 

1963 births
Kuleli Military High School alumni
Lecturers
Living people
21st-century travel writers
Turkish travel writers
Tour guides